Partitioning defective 6 homolog beta is a protein that in humans is encoded by the PARD6B gene.

Function 

This gene is a member of the PAR6 family and encodes a protein with a PSD95/Discs-large/ZO1 (PDZ) domain, an OPR domain and a semi-Cdc42/Rac interactive binding (CRIB) domain. This cytoplasmic protein is involved in asymmetrical cell division and cell polarization processes as a member of a multi-protein complex.

Interactions 

PARD6B has been shown to interact with:
 CDC42, 
 Protein kinase Mζ,
 RAC1, and
 RHOQ.

References

Further reading